Benjamin Chabanet (born 4 November 1988) is a French rower. He competed in the men's quadruple sculls event at the 2012 Summer Olympics.

References

External links
 

1988 births
Living people
French male rowers
Olympic rowers of France
Rowers at the 2012 Summer Olympics
People from Vichy
Sportspeople from Allier